Liobagrus reinii is a species of catfish in the family Amblycipitidae (the torrent catfishes) endemic to Japan.

Habitat and ecology 
L. reinii lives under cobbles and boulders, in bedrock crevices, and in clumps of roots of terrestrial vegetation along banks.

References

External links 
 
 

Liobagrus
Freshwater fish of Japan
Endemic fauna of Japan
Taxa named by Franz Martin Hilgendorf
Fish described in 1878